Duke of Medina de Rioseco is a hereditary title in the Peerage of Spain, accompanied by the dignity of Grandee and granted in 1538 by Charles I to Fernando Enríquez de Velasco, Admiral of Castile and Lord of Medina de Rioseco.

Dukes of Medina de Rioseco (1538)

Fernando Enríquez de Velasco, 1st Duke of Medina de Rioseco
Luis Enríquez y Téllez-Girón, 2nd Duke of Medina de Rioseco
Luis Enríquez de Cabrera, 3rd Duke of Medina de Rioseco
Luis Enríquez de Cabrera y Mendoza, 4th Duke of Medina de Rioseco
Juan Alfonso Enríquez de Cabrera, 5th Duke of Medina de Rioseco
Juan Gaspar Enríquez de Cabrera y Sandoval, 6th Duke of Medina de Rioseco
Juan Tomás Enríquez de Cabrera y Álvarez de Toledo, 7th Duke of Medina de Rioseco
Luis Enríquez de Cabrera y Álvarez de Toledo, 8th Duke of Medina de Rioseco
Pascual Enríquez de Cabrera y Almansa, 9th Duke of Medina de Rioseco
Francisco Alfonso Pimentel y de Borja, 10th Duke of Medina de Rioseco
Ignacio Enríquez de Cabrera, 11th Duke of Medina de Rioseco
Joaquín Enríquez de Cabrera y Pimentel, 12th Duke of Medina de Rioseco
Serafín Pimentel y Álvarez de Toledo, 13th Duke of Medina de Rioseco
Pedro de Alcántara Téllez-Girón y Beaufort-Spontin, 14th Duke of Medina de Rioseco
Mariano Téllez-Girón y Beaufort-Spontin, 15th Duke of Medina de Rioseco
Pedro de Alcántara Téllez-Girón y Fernández de Santilla, 16th Duke of Medina de Rioseco
María de la Piedad Téllez-Girón y Fernández de Velasco, 17th Duchess of Medina de Rioseco
María del Rosario Téllez-Girón Fernández de Córdoba, 18th Duchess of Medina de Rioseco
Bernardina Téllez-Girón y Fernández de Córdoba, 19th Duchess of Medina de Rioseco
Ángela Téllez-Girón y Duque de Estrada, 20th Duchess of Medina de Rioseco
María Asunción Latorre y Téllez-Girón, 21st Duchess of Medina de Rioseco

See also
List of dukes in the peerage of Spain
List of current Grandees of Spain

References 

Dukedoms of Spain
Grandees of Spain
Lists of dukes
Lists of Spanish nobility